Cericlamine (INN; developmental code JO-1017) is a potent and moderately selective serotonin reuptake inhibitor (SSRI) of the amphetamine family (specifically, a derivative of phentermine, and closely related to chlorphentermine, a highly selective serotonin releasing agent) that was investigated as an antidepressant for the treatment of depression, anxiety disorders, and anorexia nervosa by Jouveinal but did not complete development and was never marketed. It reached phase III clinical trials in 1996 before development was discontinued in 1999.

Synthesis

Arylation of methacrylic acid with a diazonium salt of 3,4-dichloroaniline (or 3,4-dichloro-benzenediazonium salt), is carried out according to the Meerwein reaction catalysed by a metallic halide. For the next step, the halide is displaced by dimethylamine, then esterification is performed, followed by reduction with a metal hydride.

See also 

 3,4-Dichloroamphetamine
 Alaproclate
 Bupropion
 Chlorphentermine
 Clortermine
 Cloforex
 Etolorex
 Femoxetine
 Ifoxetine
 Indalpine
 Methylenedioxyphentermine
 Omiloxetine
 Panuramine
 para-Chloroamphetamine
 para-Chloromethamphetamine
 Phentermine
 Pirandamine
 Seproxetine
 Viqualine
 Zimelidine

References 

Dimethylamino compounds
Antidepressants
Chlorobenzenes
Phenethylamines
Selective serotonin reuptake inhibitors
Substituted amphetamines